Robert Haddon may refer to:

 Robert Joseph Haddon (1866–1929),  England-born architect in Victoria, Australia
 Robert Tahupotiki Haddon (1866–1936), New Zealand Methodist minister